Moradlu (also Romanized as Morādlū) is a village in Gowg Tappeh Rural District, in the Central District of Bileh Savar County, Ardabil Province, Iran. At the 2006 census, its population was 707, in 134 families.

References 

Towns and villages in Bileh Savar County